Staroyakupovo (İśke Yaqup) is a rural locality (a village) in Matrayevsky Selsoviet, Zilairsky District, Bashkortostan, Russia. The population was 50 as of 2010. There are 3 streets.

Geography 
Sultanmirovo is located 68 km east of Zilair (the district's administrative centre) by road. Yaparsaz is the nearest rural locality.

References 

Rural localities in Zilairsky District